Bacar Baldé (born 15 January 1992) is a Bissau-Guinean professional footballer who plays for Portuguese club SC Ideal mainly as a left back but also as a left midfielder.

Club career
Born in Bissau, Baldé moved to Portugal at the age of 17, and played two years with FC Porto's juniors. He made his debut as a senior with F.C. Paços de Ferreira in the Primeira Liga during the 2011–12 season, but was also loaned twice to clubs in the Segunda Liga.

Baldé signed with Poland's Zawisza Bydgoszcz in the summer of 2013. However, shortly after, and without having made a single official appearance, he returned to Portugal and joined Atlético Clube de Portugal also of the second division.

On 26 June 2014, Baldé returned to Portugal and its second tier with S.C. Beira-Mar. He signed for Vitória S.C. one year later, being immediately loaned to Vasco da Gama (South Africa).

In February 2016, Baldé arrived in Serbia along with Pedro Sass Petrazzi, but he only joined FK Borac Čačak officially in August after his former club dissolved. He made his debut in the Superliga late in that month, when he came on as a late substitute in a 1–0 away loss against OFK Bačka Bačka Palanka.

Baldé returned to Portugal subsequently, his spell in Serbia having been marred by financial problems. In June 2020, he signed with SC Vianense of the third division.

International career
Baldé earned his first cap for Guinea-Bissau on 4 September 2010 at the age of 18, in a 1–0 home win over Kenya for the 2012 Africa Cup of Nations qualifiers.

References

External links

1992 births
Living people
Sportspeople from Bissau
Bissau-Guinean footballers
Association football defenders
Association football midfielders
Primeira Liga players
Liga Portugal 2 players
Campeonato de Portugal (league) players
F.C. Paços de Ferreira players
F.C. Arouca players
C.D. Tondela players
Atlético Clube de Portugal players
S.C. Beira-Mar players
Vitória S.C. players
SC Mirandela players
SC Vianense players
Zawisza Bydgoszcz players
Vasco da Gama (South Africa) players
Serbian SuperLiga players
FK Borac Čačak players
Erovnuli Liga players
FC Samtredia players
Armenian Premier League players
FC Pyunik players
FC Gandzasar Kapan players
Guinea-Bissau international footballers
Bissau-Guinean expatriate footballers
Expatriate footballers in Portugal
Expatriate footballers in Poland
Expatriate soccer players in South Africa
Expatriate footballers in Serbia
Georgia
Expatriate footballers in Armenia
Bissau-Guinean expatriate sportspeople in Portugal
Bissau-Guinean expatriate sportspeople in Poland
Bissau-Guinean expatriate sportspeople in South Africa
Bissau-Guinean expatriate sportspeople in Serbia
Bissau-Guinean expatriate sportspeople in Georgia (country)
Bissau-Guinean expatriate sportspeople in Armenia